Satinderpal Singh Kahlon professionally known as Shinda Kahlon is an Indo-Canadian rapper, singer & songwriter associated with Punjabi music. Four of his singles have peaked on UK Asian and Punjabi charts by Official Charts Company; "Majhail" and "Brown Munde" have topped the charts. Kahlon released his debut EP Not By Chance in December 2020. Kahlon, alongside his label-mates AP Dhillon, Gurinder Gill and Gminxr works as trio under their label ‘Run-Up Records’.

About 
Shinda was born in 1996 into a Punjabi Sikh family and grew up in Ajnala, Amritsar.

Discography

Extended plays

Singles discography

Songwriting discography

References

External links 

 
 Shinda Kahlon on Instagram

Living people
Punjabi-language singers
Punjabi rappers
Indian singer-songwriters
Indian hip hop singers
Canadian singer-songwriters
Canadian hip hop singers
Desi musicians
Year of birth missing (living people)